Kieran Hyde (born 10 October 1989), also known by the nickname of "Kez", was an English professional rugby league footballer who last played for Oxford in Kingstone Press League 1.

Hyde signed for the Wakefield Trinity Wildcats from the Bradford Bulls, as a part of the deal which took Cain Southernwood to the Bradford Bulls. Hyde made his first team début whilst at Wakefield Trinity Wildcats in a round 21 2010's Super League XV game against St. Helens, where he scored a try from fullback. John Kear hinted that Hyde may move into the  position, instead of his usual fullback role. Hyde also played for Wakefield Trinity Wildcats in the annual Festive Challenge against Leeds Rhinos on New Year's Day 2011, coming from the bench to score a length of the field interception try.

After two seasons with the Dewsbury Rams, Hyde joined Swinton Lions in November 2015.

Hyde played for the England Schoolboys in 2008.

References

1989 births
Living people
Bradford Bulls players
Dewsbury Rams players
Doncaster R.L.F.C. players
English rugby league players
Gloucestershire All Golds players
People educated at Penistone Grammar School
Rugby league five-eighths
Rugby league fullbacks
Swinton Lions players
Wakefield Trinity players